Eduard Isaac Asser (October 19, 1809 – September 21, 1894) was a lawyer and Dutch amateur photographer.

Biography 
Asser was born in Amsterdam and became a successful lawyer and was thus able to afford his photography hobby, which was very expensive at the time.

Contributions 
Asser's experiments with Daguerrotype were initially reproductions of academic art. He is best known for his efforts to make the photographic printing process cheaper, most notably with his patent on the Procédé Asser in 1858, a photolithography process. He was an editor of the Dutch photography magazine and member of the Amsterdam photographers' society Helios.

Legacy 
Asser died in Amsterdam and he is considered the father of photography in the Netherlands. His descendants gave 200 of his earliest photos from 1839–1860 to the national collection in 1993. Since then they have been kept in the Rijksmuseum. Besides using art studio techniques for still lifes, Asser took many pictures of his family, most notably a childhood portrait of Tobias Asser.

References

External links 

 Website for early photography in the Netherlands an initiative of Mattie Boom (curator of photography at the Rijksmuseum), Saskia Asser (his great-great-granddaughter and curator at Huis Marseille), and the Photography Foundation in Amsterdam
 Eduard Isaac Asser in the Rijksmuseum
 Eduard Isaac Asser in the Joods Historisch Museum

1809 births
1894 deaths
Photographers from Amsterdam